Gordon Flood (born 24 October 1940 ) is a sailor from Bermuda, who represented his country at the 1976 Summer Olympics in Kingston, Ontario, Canada as crew member in the Soling. With helmsman Richard Belvin and fellow crew member Raymond Pitman they took the 21st place.

References

Living people
1951 births
Bermudian male sailors (sport)
Sailors at the 1976 Summer Olympics – Soling
Olympic sailors of Bermuda